The San Rafael National Park is a proposed national park in Paraguay covering an area of Atlantic Forest, grasslands and wetlands. 
Although the area was declared to be reserved for a national park in 1992, no further steps have been taken to formalize the status.
The area is under threat both from large-scale farming and from small slash-and-burn farmers.

Location

The San Rafael National Park is divided between the Itapúa and Caazapá departments.
The park is in the upper Tebicuary River basin, in the San Rafael hills.
The park would be part of the proposed Trinational Biodiversity Corridor, which aims to provide forest connections between conservation units in Brazil, Paraguay and Argentina in the Upper Paraná ecoregion.

Legal status

All of the land is privately owned, causing disputes over the designation, and in 2002 the area was declared as a "managed resources reserve".
This is equivalent to the IUCN protected area category VI.
The 2002 change was reversed in 2005.
It is still pending to be formally declared either a national park or a managed resources reserve.
The NGO Guyra Paraguay has purchased  of land in the park, which it manages as a protected area.

Environment

Rain falls throughout the year, but the wettest months are October–February.

The park covers an area of Alto Paraná Lowland Atlantic Forest, a particularly threatened type of forest in the Atlantic Forest biome.
San Rafael is in a region of transition from tall, humid forests in the Paraná River basin to lower, drier forest in the Paraguay River basin.
About 80% of the area is forest-covered.
It also has broad stretches of natural grasslands and wetlands in the northern part of Paraguay's mesopotamian grasslands.

Mammals include the jaguar (Panthera onca) and South American tapir (Tapirus terrestris).
The park is home to four globally threatened large mammals.
Over 400 species of birds have been identified in the park, the greatest number of any site in Paraguay.
12 of the species are globally threatened, including the vinaceous-breasted amazon (Amazona vinacea) and black-fronted piping guan (Pipile jacutinga).
The park holds important populations of helmeted woodpecker (Celeus galeatus), russet-winged spadebill (Platyrinchus leucoryphus), cock-tailed tyrant (Alectrurus tricolor) and saffron-cowled blackbird (Xanthopsar flavus).

Threats

As of 2016 there was no effective forest management.
The soil is fertile, and there is pressure to allow the park area to be turned over to soya farming.
From 1989 onward the forest has been steadily cleared and grassland converted for use as pasture or farmland.
As of 2007 more than 22% of the original area had been drastically modified.
The region is threatened by large-scale intensive agriculture, unsustainable slash-and-burn agriculture and fires. 
Only a tenuous link now connects San Rafael to the Caazapá National Park.

Notes

Sources

National parks of Paraguay
Protected areas of the Atlantic Forest